Cogia calchas, the mimosa skipper, is a Nearctic species of dicot skipper in the butterfly family Hesperiidae.

References

Further reading

 

Eudaminae
Articles created by Qbugbot